William Edward Nicholson  (26 January 1919 – 23 October 2004) was an English football player, coach, manager and scout who had a 55 year association with Tottenham Hotspur. He is considered one of the most important figures in the club's history, winning eight major trophies in his 16-year managerial spell, and most notably guiding the team to their Double-winning season of 1960–61.

Early life
Born in Scarborough, North Riding of Yorkshire, the eighth of nine children, Nicholson was a pupil at the town's Gladstone Road Junior School before attending Scarborough High School for Boys. He worked briefly in a laundry after leaving school, but at the age of 17 he was invited to a trial at Tottenham Hotspur, where he arrived on 16 March 1936 after playing for Young Liberals and Scarborough Working Men’s Club in his youth. After a month's trial, he was taken on as a ground-staff boy at £2 a week. He played for Spurs' nursery club Northfleet United and won a Kent Senior Cup winners medal in the final against Dover. He signed as a full professional for Tottenham in August 1938, and played his first Football League game at Ewood Park against Blackburn Rovers on 22 October 1938.

Playing career
Nicholson joined the Durham Light Infantry on the outbreak of the Second World War in 1939. As a professional footballer he was sent on a Physical Education course and was made a sergeant-instructor, training new intakes of troops throughout the war. During the Second World War he was a guest player for several clubs including Newcastle United where he played on 19 occasions. Although the war probably cost him half his playing career, he did not regret it as his experiences taught him the man-management skills which were to have such a great effect later in his career.

In 1946, Nicholson returned to the Spurs first team, playing at centre half for two seasons, then moving to right half for a further six years. He was a vital part of the legendary "push and run" Tottenham team which won the league championship in the 1950–51 season.

He made his full international debut for England on 19 May 1951 against Portugal at Goodison Park, Liverpool, and made an immediate impression by scoring with his first touch of the ball after only 19 seconds. This proved to be his only international appearance due to injuries, his habit of putting his club before his country, and the dominance of Billy Wright. Nicholson is quoted as saying "My duty is to get fit for Tottenham. Well, they pay my wages, don't they?". Of his only appearance he said "Stan Pearson nodded it back and I ran on to let go a first time shot which, from the moment I hit it, I knew was going in. But for the next game they brought back Billy Wright and I accepted that because he was the better player". Nicholson is the only player to have scored for England with his first touch in international football and subsequently never play at that level again.

Managerial career

Nicholson took a Football Association (FA) coaching course and joined the coaching staff at Tottenham upon his retirement as a player. He quickly rose through the ranks of the coaching staff to become first team coach in 1955. He subsequently assisted England manager Walter Winterbottom at the 1958 FIFA World Cup in Sweden.

On 11 October 1958, Nicholson was called to the Tottenham boardroom and appointed manager of the club in succession to Jimmy Anderson. At the time the club was sixth from the bottom of the First Division and there was little indication that the greatest period in the history of the club was about to begin. That afternoon, in the club's first game under Nicholson's management, Tottenham Hotspur beat Everton 10–4 at White Hart Lane. This represented a new club record, surpassed only by their 13–2 (10–1 at half-time) FA Cup replay win over Crewe Alexandra in the 1959–60 season.

Less than two years later Spurs wrote their place in the history books when they won the Football League championship and the FA Cup in the 1960–61 season, the first "double" of the twentieth century. Spurs dominated the opposition that year, winning their first eleven games and scoring 115 goals in 42 games. The following year they won the FA Cup again, and narrowly missed a place in the 1961–62 European Cup Final, losing to Benfica in the semi-final.

In the 1962–63 season, Nicholson again put Spurs in the history books when they became the first British club to win a major European trophy. In Rotterdam on 15 May 1963, Spurs defeated favourites Atlético Madrid 5–1 to win the European Cup Winners Cup.

In 1966–67 Nicholson's Spurs won their third FA Cup in seven years by beating Chelsea in the first-ever all-London final. This was followed by a string of trophies in the early 1970s – the League Cup was won in 1970–71 and 1972–73, and the UEFA Cup in 1971–72.

As the 1970s wore on, Nicholson became increasingly disillusioned with football, in particular the increased player wages and the endemic hooliganism. He was appalled by the hooliganism he witnessed at the UEFA Cup final that Spurs lost to Feyenoord. Nicholson decided to resign after a poor start to the 1974–75 season and losing 4–0 to Middlesbrough in the League Cup in September 1974. Nicholson later said of his resignation: "The simple truth was that I was burned out, I had no more to offer." His tenure ended in acrimony as Nicholson wished to select for his replacement Danny Blanchflower as manager and Johnny Giles as player-coach, but Spurs chairman Sidney Wale was angered that Nicholson had contacted Giles and Blanchflower without his knowledge. Although Nicholson had intended to stay at the club as an advisor, the club chose to sever all ties with a £10,000 payoff and refused Nicholson a testimonial.

Post-managerial career
After quitting the Spurs manager's job, Nicholson spent a year at West Ham United as an advisor and a scout. When Keith Burkinshaw became Spurs' manager in 1976, one of his first requests was that Nicholson be brought back to White Hart Lane as a consultant. His knowledge and experience were invaluable, and he showed that he still had an eye for players by recommending several to Burkinshaw, including Graham Roberts, Tony Galvin, and Gary Mabbutt. Nicholson continued to work as a consultant until 1991, when he was awarded the title of Club President.

Recognition
Nicholson was appointed an OBE in 1975. In 1999 an approach road to White Hart Lane was named Bill Nicholson Way in his honour. On 8 August 2001, the club played a testimonial match in Nicholson's honour against Italian club ACF Fiorentina, following an initial testimonial against West Ham on 21 August 1983. In 2003 Nicholson was inducted into the English Football Hall of Fame in recognition of his impact as a manager. Spurs fans had also campaigned for many years to have Nicholson knighted in recognition of his outstanding achievements and contribution to football but they were unsuccessful. Bill Nicholson died on 23 October 2004 after a long illness.

Bill Nicholson has been credited with saying, 'It is better to fail aiming high than to succeed aiming low. And we of Spurs have set our sights very high, so high in fact that even failure will have in it an echo of glory.' Sports historian, Norman Giller, who has written biographies on both Nicholson and his skipper Danny Blanchflower, traces this quote to Blanchflower. "Bill was a blunt Yorkshireman who just did not use this sort of language," Giller has written in "Danny was the poet of the team and he both said this and wrote it in his newspaper columns when captain of Tottenham. Somehow somebody has put the words into Nicholson's mouth, but it was definitely Danny who said it first."

Honours

As a player
Tottenham Hotspur
 Football League First Division: 1950–51 
 Football League Second Division: 1949–50
 FA Charity Shield: 1951

As a manager
Tottenham Hotspur
 Football League First Division: 1960–61 
 FA Cup: 1960–61, 1961–62, 1966–67
 Football League Cup: 1970–71, 1972–73
 FA Charity Shield: 1961, 1962, 1967 (shared)
 UEFA Cup: 1971–72, runner up: 1973-74
 European Cup Winners' Cup: 1962–63
 Anglo-Italian League Cup: 1971

See also
 List of UEFA Cup winning managers
 Joy Brook
 List of English football championship winning managers
 List of longest managerial reigns in association football

References

Further reading

External links
Bill Nicholson quotes

1919 births
2004 deaths
People educated at Scarborough High School for Boys
Sportspeople from Scarborough, North Yorkshire
Footballers from North Yorkshire
English footballers
Association football wing halves
Northfleet United F.C. players
Tottenham Hotspur F.C. players
English Football League players
English Football League representative players
England international footballers
1950 FIFA World Cup players
English football managers
Tottenham Hotspur F.C. managers
Tottenham Hotspur F.C. non-playing staff
West Ham United F.C. non-playing staff
English Football League managers
Association football coaches
Association football scouts
UEFA Cup winning managers
English Football Hall of Fame inductees
Officers of the Order of the British Empire
British Army personnel of World War II
Durham Light Infantry soldiers
Military personnel from Yorkshire